"The Joy of Sect" is the thirteenth episode of the ninth season of the American animated television series The Simpsons. It originally aired on the Fox network in the United States on February 8, 1998. In the episode, a cult takes over Springfield, and the Simpson family become members.

David Mirkin conceived the initial idea for the episode, Steve O'Donnell was the lead writer, and Steven Dean Moore directed. The writers drew on many groups to develop the Movementarians, but were principally influenced by Scientology, Heaven's Gate, the Unification Church ("Moonies"), the Rajneesh movement, and Peoples Temple. The show contains many references to popular culture, including the title reference to The Joy of Sex and a gag involving Rover from the television program The Prisoner.

"The Joy of Sect" was later analyzed from religious, philosophical, and psychological perspectives; books on The Simpsons compared the Movementarians to many of the same groups from which the writers had drawn influence.

Both USA Today and The A.V. Club featured "The Joy of Sect" in lists of important episodes of The Simpsons.

Plot
While at the airport, Bart and Homer meet recruiters for the Movementarians, a new religious movement, who invite Homer and many Springfield residents to their compound. There, an orientation film tells that a mysterious man known as "The Leader" will guide Movementarians aboard a spaceship to the planet Blisstonia, with audience members being pressured to sit back down and continue watching by having a spotlight shone on them. The lengthy film brainwashes the attendees into worshipping The Leader, except for Homer, who was not paying attention. After failing to brainwash Homer through humiliation and starvation, the recruiters succeed with a chant to the tune of the Batman theme song.

Almost all the townspeople join the cult, including Homer, who moves his family to the Movementarian compound. At the same time, Mr. Burns makes an unsuccessful attempt to start a religion of his own in order to achieve tax-exemption. Though defiant at first, all the Simpson children are converted to Movementarianism. Marge is the only family member to resist, and escapes from the heavily guarded compound. Outside, she finds Reverend Lovejoy, Ned Flanders, and Groundskeeper Willie, who have all resisted the Movementarians, and with their help, she tricks her family into leaving the compound with her.

At the Flanders' home, Marge deprograms her kids by baiting them with fake hoverbikes and then works on Homer with a glass of beer. However, as a drop of beer lands on his tongue, he is recaptured by the Movementarians' lawyers. Back at the compound, Homer reveals to the other Movementarians that he is no longer brainwashed and attempts to expose the cult as a fraud, but opening the doors of the Forbidden Barn he and the crowd are surprised to find an actual spaceship. However, the crude spaceship disintegrates as it takes flight, revealing The Leader on a pedal-powered aircraft fleeing with everyone's money. He subsequently crashes and Cletus Spuckler forces him to give over the money at gunpoint.

The Simpsons return home, where Lisa remarks how wonderful it is to once again be able to think for themselves. The episode ends with the family monotonously repeating the words of a Fox announcer: that they "are watching Fox".

Production

The episode was the second and last episode written by Steve O'Donnell and was based on an idea from David Mirkin. Mirkin had been the show runner during seasons five and six, but had been brought back to run two episodes during the ninth season. He said he was attracted to the notion of parodying cults because they are "comical, interesting and twisted". He conceived the episode after hearing a radio show about the history of cults whilst driving home one night. The main group of writers that worked on the episode were Mirkin, O'Donnell, Jace Richdale, and Kevin Curran. The episode's title "The Joy of Sect" was pitched by Richdale. Steven Dean Moore directed the episode.

Aspects of the Movementarians were inspired by different cults and religions, including Scientology, Jim Jones and the Peoples Temple, the Heaven's Gate group, the Unification Church, the Oneida Society, and Bhagwan Shree Rajneesh. In particular, the leader driving through the fields in a Rolls-Royce was partly inspired by the Bhagwans, and the notion of holding people inside the camp against their will was a reference to Jim Jones. The name "Movementarians" itself was simply chosen for its awkward sound. The scene during the six-hour orientation video where those who get up to leave are induced to stay through peer pressure and groupthink was a reference to the Unification Church and EST Training. The show's producers acknowledged that the ending scene of the episode was a poke at Fox as "being the evil mind controlling network". The episode's script was written in 1997, at roughly the same time that the members of the Heaven's Gate cult committed mass suicide. The writers noticed strange parallels between Mirkin's first draft and Heaven's Gate, including the belief in the arrival of a spaceship and the group's members wearing matching clothes and odd sneakers. Because of these coincidences, several elements of the episode were changed so that it would be more sensitive in the wake of the suicides.

Themes

Chris Turner's book Planet Simpson: How a Cartoon Masterpiece Defined a Generation describes the Movementarians as a cross between the Church of Scientology and Raëlism, with lesser influences from Sun Myung Moon and Bhagwan Shree Rajneesh. Planet Simpson also notes the Simpsons' chant at the conclusion of the episode as evidence of a "true high-growth quasi-religious cult of our time", referring to television. The book refers to a "Cult of Pop", which it describes as "a fast growing mutation ersatz religion that has filled the gaping hole in the West's social fabric where organized religion used to be". Martin Hunt of FACTnet notes several similarities between the Movementarians and the Church of Scientology. "The Leader" physically resembles L. Ron Hubbard; the Movementarians' use of a 10-trillion-year commitment for its members alludes to the (Scientology) Sea Org's billion-year contract; and both groups make extensive use of litigation. The A.V. Club analyzes the episode in a piece called "Springfield joins a cult", comparing the Movementarians' plans to travel to "Blisstonia" to Heaven's Gate's promises of bliss after traveling to the comet Hale–Bopp. However, it also notes that "The Joy of Sect" is a commentary on organized religion in general, quoting Bart as saying, "Church, cult, cult, church. So we get bored someplace else every Sunday." Planet Simpson discusses The Simpsons' approach to deprogramming in the episode, noting groundskeeper Willie's conversion to the philosophy of the Movementarians after learning about it while attempting to deprogram Homer. Author Chris Turner suggests that Marge should have instead gone with the "Conformco Brain Deprogrammers" used in the episode "Burns' Heir" to convince Bart to leave Mr. Burns and come back home.

In The Simpsons and Philosophy: The D'oh! of Homer, the authors cite "escaping from a cult commune in 'The Joy of Sect'" as evidence of "Aristotle's virtuous personality traits in Marge." As the title suggests, the book The Psychology of the Simpsons: D'oh! examines "The Joy of Sect" from a psychological point of view. It discusses the psychology of decision-making in the episode, noting, "Homer is becoming a full-blown member of the Movementarians not by a rational choice, ... but through the process of escalating behavioral commitments." The Psychology of the Simpsons explains the key recruitment techniques used by the Movementarians, including the charismatic leader, established authority based on a religious entity or alien being (in this case "Blisstonia"), and the method of taking away free choice through acceptance of the Leader's greatness. The book also analyzes the techniques used during the six-hour Movementarian recruitment film. In that scene, those who rise to leave are reminded that they are allowed to leave whenever they wish. They are, however, questioned in front of the group as to specifically why they wish to leave, and these individuals end up staying to finish watching the film. The book describes this technique as "subtle pressure", in contrast to the "razor wire, landmines, angry dogs, crocodiles and evil mystery bubble Marge confronts to escape, while being reminded again that she is certainly free to leave". The Psychology of the Simpsons writes that "the Leader" is seen as an authority figure, because "he has knowledge or abilities that others do not, but want". Instead of traditional mathematics textbooks, the children on the compound learn from Arithmetic the Leader's Way and Science for Leader Lovers.

In Pinsky's The Gospel According to the Simpsons, one of the show's writers recounted to the author that the producers of The Simpsons had vetoed a planned episode on Scientology in fear of the Church's "reputation for suing and harassing opponents". Pinsky found it ironic that Matt Groening spoofed Scientology in spite of the fact that the voice of Bart Simpson, Nancy Cartwright, is a Scientologist, having joined in 1991. Pinsky notes that Groening later "took a shot at Scientology" in Futurama with the fictional religion "Church of Robotology". Groening said he received a call from the Church of Scientology concerned about the use of a similar name.

Cultural references 
When Marge attempts to leave the compound, she is chased by the Rover guard "balloon" from the 1967 television program The Prisoner. Neal Hefti and Nelson Riddle's theme music to the 1960s Batman series is used in the episode to indoctrinate Homer. When Mr. Burns introduces his new religion, most of the sequence is a parody of the promotional video of Michael Jackson's 1995 album HIStory: Past, Present and Future, Book I.

Willie scratching his nails along the church window to get Marge and Reverend Lovejoy's attention is a reference to the 1975 film Jaws, in which the character Quint performs a similar action. The Springfield Airport contains the "Just Crichton and King Bookstore", referencing Michael Crichton and Stephen King, authors famous for their airport novels, carrying only their works.

Reception
In its original broadcast, "The Joy of Sect" finished 27th in ratings for the week of February 2–8, 1998, with a Nielsen rating of 9.6, equivalent to approximately 9.4 million viewing households. It was the fourth highest-rated show on the Fox network that week, following The X-Files, King of the Hill, and Ally McBeal.

In a 2006 article in USA Today, "The Joy of Sect" was highlighted among six other episodes of The Simpsons season 9, along with "Trash of the Titans", "The Last Temptation of Krust", "The Cartridge Family", "Dumbbell Indemnity", and "Das Bus". The A.V. Club featured the episode in its analysis of "15 Simpsons Moments That Perfectly Captured Their Eras". The Daily Mirror gave the episode positive mention in its review of the Season 9 DVD release, calling it "hilarious". Isaac Mitchell-Frey of the Herald Sun cited the episode as the highlight of the season.

The Sunday Mail highlighted the episode for their "Family Choice" segment, commenting: "Normally, a show about religious cults would spell doom and gloom. Only Bart, of The Simpsons, could make a comedy out of it but then, he and his cartoon family are a cult in their own right anyway!" Jeff Shalda of The Simpsons Archive used the episode as an example of one of the "good qualities present in The Simpsons", while analyzing why some other aspects of The Simpsons make Christians upset.

The authors of the book I Can't Believe It's a Bigger and Better Updated Unofficial Simpsons Guide commented that the episode was "an odd one" with "a lot of good moments", and went on to state that it was "a nice twist to see Burns determined to be loved". However, the book also noted that "The Joy of Sect" is "another one where the central joke isn't strong enough to last the whole episode".

In a lesson plan developed at St Mary's College, Durham titled An Introduction to Philosophy: The Wit and Wisdom of Lisa Simpson, the episode is described in a section on "False Prophets" as applicable for "...studying the more outrageous manifestations of 'religion' or those simply alert to the teachings of Christ on the subject".

See also

 Parody religion
 Religion in The Simpsons
 Religious satire
 UFO religion

References

Citations

General and cited sources

Further reading

External links

 
 
 

1998 American television episodes
Fictional religions
Fiction about cults
Scientology in popular culture
The Simpsons (season 9) episodes